Cathy Dennis is a British singer-songwriter, record producer and actress. After a moderately successful international solo career, Dennis later received great success as a writer of pop songs, scoring eight UK number ones and winning five Ivor Novello Awards.

This is a list of released singles, songs and album tracks, recorded by other artists, that have been written or co-written by Cathy Dennis.

Below is a round-up of the chart positions achieved around the world by singles released featuring the writing credits of Cathy Dennis.

Songwriting career 
Dennis has achieved critical and commercial success as a songwriter, winning a number of award-winning songs and penning many international hit singles. She has also contributed backing vocals to many of these recordings. Dennis has provided songs for Simon Fuller acts such as the Spice Girls, S Club 7 and the Idol franchise contestants where she co-wrote "Bumper to Bumper", the B-side to the Spice Girls' first hit single "Wannabe".

Her highest-selling composition, "Can't Get You Out of My Head" (recorded by Kylie Minogue), spent four weeks at number one in Britain while also rekindling interest in Minogue in America (where it hit #7 on the Billboard Hot 100). Can't Get You Out of My Head sold over three million copies worldwide to become the world's second highest selling single in 2001. Her co-written single "I Kissed a Girl" by Katy Perry also hit No. 1 in the USA.

"Can't Get You Out of My Head" also won Dennis an Ivor Novello Award as 2001's most performed composition. She won the same award in 2003 for "Anything Is Possible". In the US, Dennis has received awards from Billboard, Grammy for compositions with Kylie Minogue and Britney Spears.

Dennis co-wrote the Pop Idol theme (re-used for numerous international remakes of the show, including American Idol), and many Idol contestants have recorded her songs, including Will Young, Gareth Gates, Kelly Clarkson, and Clay Aiken. Clarkson's single "Before Your Love" (a double a-side with "A Moment Like This") was Dennis' first US No. 1.

In 2011, Cathy had a cut on the soundtrack for the remake of the film Arthur starring Russell Brand, the song was called "Can't Buy You" and was produced by Mark Ronson. In 2014, she co-wrote a track on Chris Brown's album "X" which debuted at number 2 on the US Billboard 200 chart.

Most recently, Cathy has co-written 3 tracks on the Galantis album "Pharmacy", one of which, "Runaway (U & I)" reached No. 1 in the UK Dance chart and No. 9 in the US Dance chart.

Full discography of songs written by Cathy Dennis

International singles and certifications

All credited contributions
 indicates a background vocal contribution.

 indicates an un-credited vocal contribution.

Awards 
 Ivor Novello Awards 2002 – PRS Most Performed Work – "Can't Get You Out of My Head"
 Ivor Novello Awards 2002 – International Hit of the Year – "Can't Get You Out of My Head"
 Ivor Novello Awards 2002 – Ivors Dance Award – "Can't Get You Out of My Head"
 Ivor Novello Awards 2003 – Best-selling UK single – "Anything is Possible"
 Grammy Awards 2004 – Best Dance Recording – "Come into my World"
 Grammy Awards 2005 – Best Dance Recording – "Toxic"
 ASCAP Awards 2005 – Most Performed Song – "Toxic"
 Ivor Novello Awards 2005 – PRS Most Performed Work – "Toxic"
 UK Music Industry Woman of The Year Award (2006)
 ASCAP Awards 2007 – TV Theme – American Idol
 Honorary Doctorate of Music, University of East Anglia (2012)
 Grammy Awards 2016 – Best Dance Recording – "Runaway (U & I)" (Nominated)

References 

Dennis, Cathy